The Swan 44 Mk I was designed by German Frers with styling input by Andrew Winch and built by Nautor's Swan and first launched in 1989. It shared many concepts with the Swan 36 developed at the same time. The modern styling was not to everyone taste and now to some looks dated so in 1996 the boat was relaunched as the Swan 44 MkII with more conservative in house styling.

External links
 Nautor Swan
 German Frers Official Website

References

Sailing yachts
Keelboats
1980s sailboat type designs
1990s sailboat type designs
Sailboat types built by Nautor Swan
Sailboat type designs by Germán Frers